The 1918 United States elections elected the 66th United States Congress, and took place in the middle of Democratic President Woodrow Wilson's second term. The election was held during the Fourth Party System. It was the lone election to take place during America's involvement in World War I. Republicans won control of both chambers of Congress for the first time since the 1908 election.

The election took place during the Spanish flu pandemic. Campaigning was disrupted around the country. In Nebraska, for instance, authorities lifted a ban on public gatherings in early November 1918 and permitted politicians to campaign five days prior to polls opening. The turnout was 40%, which was unusually low for a midterm election (turnout was at 52% and 50% in the 1910 and 1914 midterm elections). The low turnout was possibly due to the disruption caused by the pandemic.

In an example of the six-year itch phenomenon, Republicans took complete control of Congress from the Democrats. The Republicans won large gains in the House, taking 25 seats and ending coalition control of the chamber. In the Senate, Republicans gained 5 seats, taking control of the chamber by a slim majority.

The elections were a major defeat for progressives and Wilson's foreign policy agenda, and foreshadowed the Republican victory in the 1920 election. Republicans ran against the expanded war-time government and the Fourteen Points, especially Wilson's proposal for the League of Nations. The Republican victory left them in control of both houses of Congress until the 1930 election.

The election was also a turning point for women's suffrage in the United States: ballot initiatives to extend suffrage to women (among all-male electorates) were held in the states of Oklahoma, Louisiana, South Dakota, and Michigan. Of these initiatives, all but the one in Louisiana passed, and despite the ongoing pandemic, extensive grassroots organizing by suffragists  meant they successfully campaigned against incumbent Senators who had refused to support the Nineteenth Amendment to the United States Constitution, including John W. Weeks of Massachusetts, who had been considered invincible, and Willard Saulsbury Jr. of Delaware.

See also
1918 United States House of Representatives elections
1918 United States Senate elections
1918 United States gubernatorial elections
 Presidency of Woodrow Wilson

References

Further reading
 Dewitt, Howard A. "Charles L. McNary and the 1918 Congressional Election." Oregon Historical Quarterly 68.2 (1967): 125-140. online
 Jenson, Carol. "Loyalty as a Political Weapon: The 1918 Campaign in Minnesota." Minnesota History 43.2 (1972): 42-57. online

 Livermore, Seward W. "The sectional issue in the 1918 congressional elections." Mississippi Valley Historical Review 35.1 (1948): 29-60. online

 Lowitt, Richard. "Senator Norris and His 1918 Campaign." Pacific Northwest Quarterly 57.3 (1966): 113-119. in Nebraska.

1918 elections in the United States
1918
United States midterm elections